The list of ship launches in 1764 includes a chronological list of some ships launched in 1764.


References

1764
Ship launches